Said Nagar(), is a town and Union Council in Wazirabad Tehsil, Gujranwala District, Punjab, Pakistan.

It is situated approximately 2 km South-Southwest of Ali Pur Chathha.

It is Muslim majority village. About 97% of its population is Muslim and other 3% is Christian.

Said Nagar was the richest town of Gujranwala when Maha Singh was chief of the Sukerchakia Misl The town's armaments industry flourished. Said Nagar was an important center for making swords and guns. Its inhabitants were very rich. Said Nagar had strong Muslim mansions and mosques. The Sikhs attacked Said Nagar and looted it. The people of Said Nagar left their hometown and settled in Gujranwala on the orders of Maha Singh. In Gujranwala they settled a separate mahalla which they named Said Nagri. During the looting of Said Nagar, the Sikhs seized a large number of arms and ammunition which further increased their strength.

Main families living there are Bhinders and Syeds.

Union Council Said Nagar now includes nearly 10 villages which includes Madrassa Chatha , Fatehpur Chatha, Dhilwan etc.

Places to visit : Masjid Haidria Said Nagar, Canal, Jamia Masjid Said Nagar.

See also

 Gujranwala
 Wazirabad

References

Cities and towns in Gujranwala District
Populated places in Wazirabad Tehsil
Union councils of Wazirabad Tehsil